The 1985 Irish Masters was the eleventh edition of the professional invitational snooker tournament, which took place from 26 to 31 March 1985. The tournament was played at Goffs in Kill, County Kildare, and featured twelve professional players.

Jimmy White won the title for the first time, beating Alex Higgins 9–5 in the final.

Main draw

References

Irish Masters
Irish Masters
Irish Masters
Irish Masters